Rail transport (also known as train transport) is a means of transport that transfers passengers and goods on wheeled vehicles running on rails, which are incorporated in tracks. In contrast to road transport, where the vehicles run on a prepared flat surface, rail vehicles (rolling stock) are directionally guided by the tracks on which they run. Tracks usually consist of steel rails. 

 
Rolling stock in a rail transport system generally encounters lower frictional resistance than rubber-tyred road vehicles, so passenger and freight cars (carriages and wagons) can be coupled into longer trains. The operation is carried out by a railway company, providing transport between train stations or freight customer facilities. Power is provided by locomotives which either draw electric power from a railway electrification system or produce their own power, usually by diesel engines or, historically, steam engines. Most tracks are accompanied by a signalling system. Railways are a safe land transport system when compared to other forms of transport. Railway transport is capable of high levels of passenger and cargo utilisation and energy efficiency, but is often less flexible and more capital-intensive than road transport, when lower traffic levels are considered.

The oldest known, man/animal-hauled railways date back to the 6th century BC in Corinth, Greece. Rail transport then commenced in mid 16th century in Germany in the form of horse-powered funiculars and wagonways. Modern rail transport commenced with the British development of the steam locomotive in Merthyr Tydfil when Richard Trevithick ran a steam locomotive and loaded wagons between Penydarren Ironworks and Abercynon in 1802. Thus the railway system in Great Britain is the oldest in the world. Built by George Stephenson and his son Robert's company Robert Stephenson and Company, the Locomotion No. 1 is the first steam locomotive to carry passengers on a public rail line, the Stockton and Darlington Railway in 1825. George Stephenson also built the first public inter-city railway line in the world to use only the steam locomotives, the Liverpool and Manchester Railway which opened in 1830. With steam engines, one could construct mainline railways, which were a key component of the Industrial Revolution. Also, railways reduced the costs of shipping, and allowed for fewer lost goods, compared with water transport, which faced occasional sinking of ships. The change from canals to railways allowed for "national markets" in which prices varied very little from city to city. The spread of the railway network and the use of railway timetables, led to the standardisation of time (railway time) in Britain based on Greenwich Mean Time. Prior to this, major towns and cities varied their local time relative to GMT. The invention and development of the railway in the United Kingdom was one of the most important technological inventions of the 19th century. The world's first underground railway, the Metropolitan Railway (part of the London Underground), opened in 1863.

In the 1880s, electrified trains were introduced, leading to electrification of tramways and rapid transit systems. Starting during the 1940s, the non-electrified railways in most countries had their steam locomotives replaced by diesel-electric locomotives, with the process being almost complete by the 2000s. During the 1960s, electrified high-speed railway systems were introduced in Japan and later in some other countries. Many countries are in the process of replacing diesel locomotives with electric locomotives, mainly due to environmental concerns, a notable example being Switzerland, which has completely electrified its network. Other forms of guided ground transport outside the traditional railway definitions, such as monorail or maglev, have been tried but have seen limited use.

Following a decline after World War II due to competition from cars and aeroplanes, rail transport has had a revival in recent decades due to road congestion and rising fuel prices, as well as governments investing in rail as a means of reducing CO2 emissions in the context of concerns about global warming.

History

The history of rail transport began in prehistoric times.

Ancient systems 

Evidence indicates that there was 6 to 8.5 km long Diolkos paved trackway, which transported boats across the Isthmus of Corinth in Greece from around 600 BC. Wheeled vehicles pulled by men and animals ran in grooves in limestone, which provided the track element, preventing the wagons from leaving the intended route. The Diolkos was in use for over 650 years, until at least the 1st century AD. Paved trackways were also later built in Roman Egypt.

In China, a railway has been discovered in southwest Henan province near Nanyang.  It was carbon-dated to be about 2200 years old, from the Qin dynasty. The rails were made from hard wood and treated against corrosion, while the railway ties were made from wood that was not treated and has since rotted. The Qin railway was designed to allow horses to gallop through to the next rail station, where they would be swapped with a fresh horse.  The railway is theorized to have been used for transportation of goods to the front-line troops and to fix the Great Wall.

Pre-steam modern systems

Wooden rails introduced 

In 1515, Cardinal Matthäus Lang wrote a description of the Reisszug, a funicular railway at the Hohensalzburg Fortress in Austria. The line originally used wooden rails and a hemp haulage rope and was operated by human or animal power, through a treadwheel. The line still exists and is operational, although in updated form and is possibly the oldest operational railway.

Wagonways (or tramways) using wooden rails, hauled by horses, started appearing in the 1550s to facilitate the transport of ore tubs to and from mines, and soon became popular in Europe. Such an operation was illustrated in Germany in 1556 by Georgius Agricola in his work De re metallica. This line used "Hund" carts with unflanged wheels running on wooden planks and a vertical pin on the truck fitting into the gap between the planks to keep it going the right way. The miners called the wagons Hunde ("dogs") from the noise they made on the tracks.

There are many references to their use in central Europe in the 16th century. Such a transport system was later used by German miners at Caldbeck, Cumbria, England, perhaps from the 1560s. A wagonway was built at Prescot, near Liverpool, sometime around 1600, possibly as early as 1594. Owned by Philip Layton, the line carried coal from a pit near Prescot Hall to a terminus about half a mile (800 m) away. A funicular railway was also made at Broseley in Shropshire some time before 1604. This carried coal for James Clifford from his mines down to the river Severn to be loaded onto barges and carried to riverside towns. The Wollaton Wagonway, completed in 1604 by Huntingdon Beaumont, has sometimes erroneously been cited as the earliest British railway. It ran from Strelley to Wollaton near Nottingham.

The Middleton Railway in Leeds, which was built in 1758, later became the world's oldest operational railway (other than funiculars), albeit now in an upgraded form. In 1764, the first railway in the Americas was built in Lewiston, New York.

Metal rails introduced 

In the late 1760s, the Coalbrookdale Company began to fix plates of cast iron to the upper surface of the wooden rails. This allowed a variation of gauge to be used. At first only balloon loops could be used for turning, but later, movable points were taken into use that allowed for switching.

A system was introduced in which unflanged wheels ran on L-shaped metal plates these became known as plateways. John Curr, a Sheffield colliery manager, invented this flanged rail in 1787, though the exact date of this is disputed. The plate rail was taken up by Benjamin Outram for wagonways serving his canals, manufacturing them at his Butterley ironworks. In 1803, William Jessop opened the Surrey Iron Railway, a double track plateway, erroneously sometimes cited as world's first public railway, in south London.

Meanwhile, William Jessop had earlier used a form of all-iron edge rail and flanged wheels successfully for an extension to the Charnwood Forest Canal at Nanpantan, Loughborough, Leicestershire in 1789. In 1790, Jessop and his partner Outram began to manufacture edge-rails. Jessop became a partner in the Butterley Company in 1790. The first public edgeway (thus also first public railway) built was Lake Lock Rail Road in 1796. Although the primary purpose of the line was to carry coal, it also carried passengers.

These two systems of constructing iron railways, the "L" plate-rail and the smooth edge-rail, continued to exist side by side until well into the early 19th century. The flanged wheel and edge-rail eventually proved its superiority and became the standard for railways.

Cast iron used in rails proved unsatisfactory because it was brittle and broke under heavy loads. The wrought iron invented by John Birkinshaw in 1820 replaced cast iron. Wrought iron (usually simply referred to as "iron") was a ductile material that could undergo considerable deformation before breaking, making it more suitable for iron rails. But iron was expensive to produce until Henry Cort patented the puddling process in 1784. In 1783 Cort also patented the rolling process, which was 15 times faster at consolidating and shaping iron than hammering. These processes greatly lowered the cost of producing iron and rails. The next important development in iron production was hot blast developed by James Beaumont Neilson (patented 1828), which considerably reduced the amount of coke (fuel) or charcoal needed to produce pig iron. Wrought iron was a soft material that contained slag or dross. The softness and dross tended to make iron rails distort and delaminate and they lasted less than 10 years. Sometimes they lasted as little as one year under high traffic. All these developments in the production of iron eventually led to replacement of composite wood/iron rails with superior all-iron rails.

The introduction of the Bessemer process, enabling steel to be made inexpensively, led to the era of great expansion of railways that began in the late 1860s. Steel rails lasted several times longer than iron. Steel rails made heavier locomotives possible, allowing for longer trains and improving the productivity of railroads. The Bessemer process introduced nitrogen into the steel, which caused the steel to become brittle with age. The open hearth furnace began to replace the Bessemer process near the end of the 19th century, improving the quality of steel and further reducing costs. Thus steel completely replaced the use of iron in rails, becoming standard for all railways.

The first passenger horsecar or tram, Swansea and Mumbles Railway was opened between Swansea and Mumbles in Wales in 1807. Horses remained the preferable mode for tram transport even after the arrival of steam engines until the end of the 19th century, because they were cleaner compared to steam-driven trams which caused smoke in city streets.

Steam power introduced 

In 1784 James Watt, a Scottish inventor and mechanical engineer, patented a design for a steam locomotive. Watt had improved the steam engine of Thomas Newcomen, hitherto used to pump water out of mines, and developed a reciprocating engine in 1769 capable of powering a wheel. This was a large stationary engine, powering cotton mills and a variety of machinery; the state of boiler technology necessitated the use of low-pressure steam acting upon a vacuum in the cylinder, which required a separate condenser and an air pump. Nevertheless, as the construction of boilers improved, Watt investigated the use of high-pressure steam acting directly upon a piston, raising the possibility of a smaller engine that might be used to power a vehicle. Following his patent, Watt's employee William Murdoch produced a working model of a self-propelled steam carriage in that year.

The first full-scale working railway steam locomotive was built in the United Kingdom in 1804 by Richard Trevithick, a British engineer born in Cornwall. This used high-pressure steam to drive the engine by one power stroke. The transmission system employed a large flywheel to even out the action of the piston rod. On 21 February 1804, the world's first steam-powered railway journey took place when Trevithick's unnamed steam locomotive hauled a train along the tramway of the Penydarren ironworks, near Merthyr Tydfil in South Wales. Trevithick later demonstrated a locomotive operating upon a piece of circular rail track in Bloomsbury, London, the Catch Me Who Can, but never got beyond the experimental stage with railway locomotives, not least because his engines were too heavy for the cast-iron plateway track then in use.

The first commercially successful steam locomotive was Matthew Murray's rack locomotive Salamanca built for the Middleton Railway in Leeds in 1812. This twin-cylinder locomotive was light enough to not break the edge-rails track and solved the problem of adhesion by a cog-wheel using teeth cast on the side of one of the rails. Thus it was also the first rack railway.

This was followed in 1813 by the locomotive Puffing Billy built by Christopher Blackett and William Hedley for the Wylam Colliery Railway, the first successful locomotive running by adhesion only. This was accomplished by the distribution of weight between a number of wheels. Puffing Billy is now on display in the Science Museum in London, and is the oldest locomotive in existence.

In 1814 George Stephenson, inspired by the early locomotives of Trevithick, Murray and Hedley, persuaded the manager of the Killingworth colliery where he worked to allow him to build a steam-powered machine. Stephenson played a pivotal role in the development and widespread adoption of the steam locomotive. His designs considerably improved on the work of the earlier pioneers. He built the locomotive Blücher, also a successful flanged-wheel adhesion locomotive. In 1825 he built the locomotive Locomotion for the Stockton and Darlington Railway in the north east of England, which became the first public steam railway in the world in 1825, although it used both horse power and steam power on different runs. In 1829, he built the locomotive Rocket, which entered in and won the Rainhill Trials. This success led to Stephenson establishing his company as the pre-eminent builder of steam locomotives for railways in Great Britain and Ireland, the United States, and much of Europe. The first public railway which used only steam locomotives, all the time, was Liverpool and Manchester Railway, built in 1830.

Steam power continued to be the dominant power system in railways around the world for more than a century.

Electric power introduced 

The first known electric locomotive was built in 1837 by chemist Robert Davidson of Aberdeen in Scotland, and it was powered by galvanic cells (batteries). Thus it was also the earliest battery electric locomotive. Davidson later built a larger locomotive named Galvani, exhibited at the Royal Scottish Society of Arts Exhibition in 1841. The seven-ton vehicle had two direct-drive reluctance motors, with fixed electromagnets acting on iron bars attached to a wooden cylinder on each axle, and simple commutators. It was tested on the Edinburgh and Glasgow Railway in September of the following year, but the limited power from batteries prevented its general use. It was destroyed by railway workers, who saw it as a threat to their job security.

Werner von Siemens demonstrated an electric railway in 1879 in Berlin. The world's first electric tram line, Gross-Lichterfelde Tramway, opened in Lichterfelde near Berlin, Germany, in 1881. It was built by Siemens. The tram ran on 180 volts DC, which was supplied by running rails. In 1891 the track was equipped with an overhead wire and the line was extended to Berlin-Lichterfelde West station. The Volk's Electric Railway opened in 1883 in Brighton, England. The railway is still operational, thus making it the oldest operational electric railway in the world. Also in 1883, Mödling and Hinterbrühl Tram opened near Vienna in Austria. It was the first tram line in the world in regular service powered from an overhead line. Five years later, in the U.S. electric trolleys were pioneered in 1888 on the Richmond Union Passenger Railway, using equipment designed by Frank J. Sprague.

The first use of electrification on a main line was on a four-mile section of the Baltimore Belt Line of the Baltimore and Ohio Railroad (B&O) in 1895 connecting the main portion of the B&O to the new line to New York through a series of tunnels around the edges of Baltimore's downtown. Electricity quickly became the power supply of choice for subways, abetted by the Sprague's invention of multiple-unit train control in 1897. By the early 1900s most street railways were electrified.

The London Underground, the world's oldest underground railway, opened in 1863, and it began operating electric services using a fourth rail system in 1890 on the City and South London Railway, now part of the London Underground Northern line. This was the first major railway to use electric traction. The world's first deep-level electric railway, it runs from the City of London, under the River Thames, to Stockwell in south London.

The first practical AC electric locomotive was designed by Charles Brown, then working for Oerlikon, Zürich. In 1891, Brown had demonstrated long-distance power transmission, using three-phase AC, between a hydro-electric plant at Lauffen am Neckar and Frankfurt am Main West, a distance of 280 km. Using experience he had gained while working for Jean Heilmann on steam-electric locomotive designs, Brown observed that three-phase motors had a higher power-to-weight ratio than DC motors and, because of the absence of a commutator, were simpler to manufacture and maintain. However, they were much larger than the DC motors of the time and could not be mounted in underfloor bogies: they could only be carried within locomotive bodies.

In 1894, Hungarian engineer Kálmán Kandó developed a new type 3-phase asynchronous electric drive motors and generators for electric locomotives. Kandó's early 1894 designs were first applied in a short three-phase AC tramway in Évian-les-Bains (France), which was constructed between 1896 and 1898.

In 1896, Oerlikon installed the first commercial example of the system on the Lugano Tramway. Each 30-tonne locomotive had two  motors run by three-phase 750 V 40 Hz fed from double overhead lines. Three-phase motors run at constant speed and provide regenerative braking, and are well suited to steeply graded routes, and the first main-line three-phase locomotives were supplied by Brown (by then in partnership with Walter Boveri) in 1899 on the 40 km Burgdorf–Thun line, Switzerland.

Italian railways were the first in the world to introduce electric traction for the entire length of a main line rather than a short section. The 106 km Valtellina line was opened on 4 September 1902, designed by Kandó and a team from the Ganz works. The electrical system was three-phase at 3 kV 15 Hz. In 1918, Kandó invented and developed the rotary phase converter, enabling electric locomotives to use three-phase motors whilst supplied via a single overhead wire, carrying the simple industrial frequency (50 Hz) single phase AC of the high voltage national networks.

An important contribution to the wider adoption of AC traction came from SNCF of France after World War II. The company conducted trials at AC 50 Hz, and established it as a standard. Following SNCF's successful trials, 50 Hz, now also called industrial frequency was adopted as standard for main-lines across the world.

Diesel power introduced 

Earliest recorded examples of an internal combustion engine for railway use included a prototype designed by William Dent Priestman, which was examined by Sir William Thomson in 1888 who described it as a "[Priestman oil engine] mounted upon a truck which is worked on a temporary line of rails to show the adaptation of a petroleum engine for locomotive purposes.". In 1894, a  two axle machine built by Priestman Brothers was used on the Hull Docks.

In 1906, Rudolf Diesel, Adolf Klose and the steam and diesel engine manufacturer Gebrüder Sulzer founded Diesel-Sulzer-Klose GmbH to manufacture diesel-powered locomotives. Sulzer had been manufacturing diesel engines since 1898. The Prussian State Railways ordered a diesel locomotive from the company in 1909. The world's first diesel-powered locomotive was operated in the summer of 1912 on the Winterthur–Romanshorn railway in Switzerland, but was not a commercial success. The locomotive weight was 95 tonnes and the power was 883 kW with a maximum speed of 100 km/h. Small numbers of prototype diesel locomotives were produced in a number of countries through the mid-1920s. The Soviet Union operated three experimental units of different designs since late 1925, though only one of them (the E el-2) proved technically viable.

A significant breakthrough occurred in 1914, when Hermann Lemp, a General Electric electrical engineer, developed and patented a reliable direct current electrical control system (subsequent improvements were also patented by Lemp). Lemp's design used a single lever to control both engine and generator in a coordinated fashion, and was the prototype for all diesel–electric locomotive control systems. In 1914, world's first functional diesel–electric railcars were produced for the Königlich-Sächsische Staatseisenbahnen (Royal Saxon State Railways) by Waggonfabrik Rastatt with electric equipment from Brown, Boveri & Cie and diesel engines from Swiss Sulzer AG. They were classified as DET 1 and DET 2 (de.wiki). The first regular use of diesel-electric locomotives was in switching (shunter) applications. General Electric produced several small switching locomotives in the 1930s (the famous "44-tonner" switcher was introduced in 1940) Westinghouse Electric and Baldwin collaborated to build switching locomotives starting in 1929.

In 1929, the Canadian National Railways became the first North American railway to use diesels in mainline service with two units, 9000 and 9001, from Westinghouse.

High-speed rail 

Although steam and diesel services reaching speeds up to 200 km/h were started before the 1960s in Europe, they were not very successful.

The first electrified high-speed rail Tōkaidō Shinkansen was introduced in 1964 between Tokyo and Osaka in Japan. Since then high-speed rail transport, functioning at speeds up to and above 300 km/h, has been built in Japan, Spain, France, Germany, Italy, the People's Republic of China, Taiwan (Republic of China), the United Kingdom, South Korea, Scandinavia, Belgium and the Netherlands. The construction of many of these lines has resulted in the dramatic decline of short-haul flights and automotive traffic between connected cities, such as the London–Paris–Brussels corridor, Madrid–Barcelona, Milan–Rome–Naples, as well as many other major lines.

High-speed trains normally operate on standard gauge tracks of continuously welded rail on grade-separated right-of-way that incorporates a large turning radius in its design. While high-speed rail is most often designed for passenger travel, some high-speed systems also offer freight service.

Preservation

Since 1980, rail transport has changed dramatically, but a number of heritage railways continue to operate as part of living history to preserve and maintain old railway lines for services of tourist trains.

Trains

A train is a connected series of rail vehicles that move along the track. Propulsion for the train is provided by a separate locomotive or from individual motors in self-propelled multiple units. Most trains carry a revenue load, although non-revenue cars exist for the railway's own use, such as for maintenance-of-way purposes. The engine driver (engineer in North America) controls the locomotive or other power cars, although people movers and some rapid transits are under automatic control.

Haulage

Traditionally, trains are pulled using a locomotive. This involves one or more powered vehicles being located at the front of the train, providing sufficient tractive force to haul the weight of the full train. This arrangement remains dominant for freight trains and is often used for passenger trains. A push–pull train has the end passenger car equipped with a driver's cab so that the engine driver can remotely control the locomotive. This allows one of the locomotive-hauled train's drawbacks to be removed, since the locomotive need not be moved to the front of the train each time the train changes direction. A railroad car is a vehicle used for the haulage of either passengers or freight.

A multiple unit has powered wheels throughout the whole train. These are used for rapid transit and tram systems, as well as many both short- and long-haul passenger trains. A railcar is a single, self-powered car, and may be electrically propelled or powered by a diesel engine. Multiple units have a driver's cab at each end of the unit, and were developed following the ability to build electric motors and other engines small enough to fit under the coach. There are only a few freight multiple units, most of which are high-speed post trains.

Motive power

Steam locomotives are locomotives with a steam engine that provides adhesion. Coal, petroleum, or wood is burned in a firebox, boiling water in the boiler to create pressurized steam. The steam travels through the smokebox before leaving via the chimney or smoke stack. In the process, it powers a piston that transmits power directly through a connecting rod (US: main rod) and a crankpin (US: wristpin) on the driving wheel (US main driver) or to a crank on a driving axle. Steam locomotives have been phased out in most parts of the world for economical and safety reasons, although many are preserved in working order by heritage railways.

Electric locomotives draw power from a stationary source via an overhead wire or third rail. Some also or instead use a battery. In locomotives that are powered by high voltage alternating current, a transformer in the locomotive converts the high voltage, low current power to low voltage, high current used in the traction motors that power the wheels. Modern locomotives may use three-phase AC induction motors or direct current motors. Under certain conditions, electric locomotives are the most powerful traction. They are also the cheapest to run and provide less noise and no local air pollution. However, they require high capital investments both for the overhead lines and the supporting infrastructure, as well as the generating station that is needed to produce electricity. Accordingly, electric traction is used on urban systems, lines with high traffic and for high-speed rail.

Diesel locomotives use a diesel engine as the prime mover. The energy transmission may be either diesel-electric, diesel-mechanical or diesel-hydraulic but diesel-electric is dominant. Electro-diesel locomotives are built to run as diesel-electric on unelectrified sections and as electric locomotives on electrified sections.

Alternative methods of motive power include magnetic levitation, horse-drawn, cable, gravity, pneumatics and gas turbine.

Passenger trains
A passenger trains stops at stations where passengers may embark and disembark. The oversight of the train is the duty of a guard/train manager/conductor. Passenger trains are part of public transport and often make up the stem of the service, with buses feeding to stations. Passenger trains provide long-distance intercity travel, daily commuter trips, or local urban transit services, operating with a diversity of vehicles, operating speeds, right-of-way requirements, and service frequency. Service frequencies are often expressed as a number of trains per hour (tph). Passenger trains can usually can be into two types of operation, intercity railway and intracity transit. Whereas intercity railway involve higher speeds, longer routes, and lower frequency (usually scheduled), intracity transit involves lower speeds, shorter routes, and higher frequency (especially during peak hours).

Intercity trains are long-haul trains that operate with few stops between cities. Trains typically have amenities such as a dining car. Some lines also provide over-night services with sleeping cars. Some long-haul trains have been given a specific name. Regional trains are medium distance trains that connect cities with outlying, surrounding areas, or provide a regional service, making more stops and having lower speeds. Commuter trains serve suburbs of urban areas, providing a daily commuting service. Airport rail links provide quick access from city centres to airports.

High-speed trains are used mostly for long-haul service and most systems are in Western Europe and East Asia. Magnetic levitation trains such as the Shanghai maglev train use under-riding magnets which attract themselves upward towards the underside of a guideway and this line has achieved somewhat higher peak speeds in day-to-day operation than conventional high-speed railways, although only over short distances. Due to their heightened speeds, route alignments for high-speed rail tend to have broader curves than conventional railways, but may have steeper grades that are more easily climbed by trains with large kinetic energy.

Their high kinetic energy translates to higher horsepower-to-ton ratios (e.g. ); this allows trains to accelerate and maintain higher speeds and negotiate steep grades as momentum builds up and recovered in downgrades (reducing cut, fill, and tunnelling requirements). Since lateral forces act on curves, curvatures are designed with the highest possible radius. All these features are dramatically different from freight operations, thus justifying exclusive high-speed rail lines if it is economically feasible.

Higher-speed rail services are intercity rail services that have top speeds higher than conventional intercity trains but the speeds are not as high as those in the high-speed rail services. These services are provided after improvements to the conventional rail infrastructure in order to support trains that can operate safely at higher speeds.

Rapid transit is an intracity system built in large cities and has the highest capacity of any passenger transport system. It is usually grade-separated and commonly built underground or elevated. At street level, smaller trams can be used. Light rails are upgraded trams that have step-free access, their own right-of-way and sometimes sections underground. Monorail systems are elevated, medium-capacity systems. A people mover is a driverless, grade-separated train that serves only a few stations, as a shuttle. Due to the lack of uniformity of rapid transit systems, route alignment varies, with diverse rights-of-way (private land, side of road, street median) and geometric characteristics (sharp or broad curves, steep or gentle grades). For instance, the Chicago 'L' trains are designed with extremely short cars to negotiate the sharp curves in the Loop. New Jersey's PATH has similar-sized cars to accommodate curves in the trans-Hudson tunnels. San Francisco's BART operates large cars on its routes.

Freight trains

Freight trains carry cargo using freight cars specialized for the type of goods. Freight trains are very efficient, with economy of scale and high energy efficiency. However, their use can be reduced by lack of flexibility, if there is need of transshipment at both ends of the trip due to lack of tracks to the points of pick-up and delivery. Authorities often encourage the use of cargo rail transport due to its efficiency and to reduce road traffic.

Container trains have become widely used in many places for general freight, particularly in North America, where double stacking reduces costs. Containers can easily be transshipped between other modes, such as ships and trucks, and at breaks of gauge. Containers have succeeded the boxcar (wagon-load), where the cargo had to be loaded and unloaded into the train manually. The intermodal containerization of cargo has revolutionized the supply chain logistics industry, reducing shipping costs significantly. In Europe, the sliding wall wagon has largely superseded the ordinary covered wagons. Other types of cars include refrigerator cars, stock cars for livestock and autoracks for road vehicles. When rail is combined with road transport, a roadrailer will allow trailers to be driven onto the train, allowing for easy transition between road and rail.

Bulk handling represents a key advantage for rail transport. Low or even zero transshipment costs combined with energy efficiency and low inventory costs allow trains to handle bulk much cheaper than by road. Typical bulk cargo includes coal, ore, grains and liquids. Bulk is transported in open-topped cars, hopper cars and tank cars.

Infrastructure

Right-of-way

Railway tracks are laid upon land owned or leased by the railway company. Owing to the desirability of maintaining modest grades, rails will often be laid in circuitous routes in hilly or mountainous terrain. Route length and grade requirements can be reduced by the use of alternating cuttings, bridges and tunnels – all of which can greatly increase the capital expenditures required to develop a right-of-way, while significantly reducing operating costs and allowing higher speeds on longer radius curves. In densely urbanised areas, railways are sometimes laid in tunnels to minimise the effects on existing properties.

Track

Track consists of two parallel steel rails, anchored perpendicular to members called sleepers (ties) of timber, concrete, steel, or plastic to maintain a consistent distance apart, or rail gauge.   Other variations are also possible, such as "slab track", in which the rails are fastened to a concrete foundation resting on a prepared subsurface.

Rail gauges are usually categorized as standard gauge (used on approximately 70% of the world's existing railway lines), broad gauge, and narrow gauge. In addition to the rail gauge, the tracks will be laid to conform with a loading gauge which defines the maximum height and width for railway vehicles and their loads to ensure safe passage through bridges, tunnels and other structures.

The track guides the conical, flanged wheels, keeping the cars on the track without active steering and therefore allowing trains to be much longer than road vehicles. The rails and ties are usually placed on a foundation made of compressed earth on top of which is placed a bed of ballast to distribute the load from the ties and to prevent the track from buckling as the ground settles over time under the weight of the vehicles passing above.

The ballast also serves as a means of drainage. Some more modern track in special areas is attached directly without ballast. Track may be prefabricated or assembled in place. By welding rails together to form lengths of continuous welded rail, additional wear and tear on rolling stock caused by the small surface gap at the joints between rails can be counteracted; this also makes for a quieter ride.

On curves, the outer rail may be at a higher level than the inner rail. This is called superelevation or cant. This reduces the forces tending to displace the track and makes for a more comfortable ride for standing livestock and standing or seated passengers. A given amount of superelevation is most effective over a limited range of speeds.

Points and switches - also known as turnouts - are the means of directing a train onto a diverging section of track. Laid similar to normal track, a point typically consists of a frog (common crossing), check rails and two switch rails. The switch rails may be moved left or right, under the control of the signalling system, to determine which path the train will follow.

Spikes in wooden ties can loosen over time, but split and rotten ties may be individually replaced with new wooden ties or concrete substitutes. Concrete ties can also develop cracks or splits, and can also be replaced individually. Should the rails settle due to soil subsidence, they can be lifted by specialized machinery and additional ballast tamped under the ties to level the rails.

Periodically, ballast must be removed and replaced with clean ballast to ensure adequate drainage. Culverts and other passages for water must be kept clear lest water is impounded by the trackbed, causing landslips. Where trackbeds are placed along rivers, additional protection is usually placed to prevent streambank erosion during times of high water. Bridges require inspection and maintenance, since they are subject to large surges of stress in a short period of time when a heavy train crosses.

Gauge incompatibility

The use of different track gauges in different regions of the world, and sometimes within the same country, can impede the movement of passengers and freight. Often elaborate transfer mechanisms are installed where two lines of different gauge meet to facilitate movement across the break of gauge. Countries with multiple gauges in use, such as India and Australia, have invested heavily to unify their rail networks. China is developing a modernized Eurasian Land Bridge to move goods by rail to Western Europe.

Train inspection systems

The inspection of railway equipment is essential for the safe movement of trains. Many types of defect detectors are in use on the world's railroads. These devices use technologies that vary from a simplistic paddle and switch to infrared and laser scanning, and even ultrasonic audio analysis. Their use has avoided many rail accidents over the 70 years they have been used.

Signalling

Railway signalling is a system used to control railway traffic safely to prevent trains from colliding. Being guided by fixed rails which generate low friction, trains are uniquely susceptible to collision since they frequently operate at speeds that do not enable them to stop quickly or within the driver's sighting distance; road vehicles, which encounter a higher level of friction between their rubber tyres and the road surface, have much shorter braking distances. Most forms of train control involve movement authority being passed from those responsible for each section of a rail network to the train crew. Not all methods require the use of signals, and some systems are specific to single track railways.

The signalling process is traditionally carried out in a signal box, a small building that houses the lever frame required for the signalman to operate switches and signal equipment. These are placed at various intervals along the route of a railway, controlling specified sections of track. More recent technological developments have made such operational doctrine superfluous, with the centralization of signalling operations to regional control rooms. This has been facilitated by the increased use of computers, allowing vast sections of track to be monitored from a single location. The common method of block signalling divides the track into zones guarded by combinations of block signals, operating rules, and automatic-control devices so that only one train may be in a block at any time.

Electrification

The electrification system provides electrical energy to the trains, so they can operate without a prime mover on board. This allows lower operating costs, but requires large capital investments along the lines. Mainline and tram systems normally have overhead wires, which hang from poles along the line. Grade-separated rapid transit sometimes use a ground third rail.

Power may be fed as direct (DC) or alternating current (AC). The most common DC voltages are 600 and 750 V for tram and rapid transit systems, and 1,500 and 3,000 V for mainlines. The two dominant AC systems are 15 kV and 25 kV.

Stations

A railway station serves as an area where passengers can board and alight from trains. A goods station is a yard which is exclusively used for loading and unloading cargo. Large passenger stations have at least one building providing conveniences for passengers, such as purchasing tickets and food. Smaller stations typically only consist of a platform. Early stations were sometimes built with both passenger and goods facilities.

Platforms are used to allow easy access to the trains, and are connected to each other via underpasses, footbridges and level crossings. Some large stations are built as culs-de-sac, with trains only operating out from one direction. Smaller stations normally serve local residential areas, and may have connection to feeder bus services. Large stations, in particular central stations, serve as the main public transport hub for the city, and have transfer available between rail services, and to rapid transit, tram or bus services.

Operations

Ownership

Since the 1980s, there has been an increasing trend to split up railway companies, with companies owning the rolling stock separated from those owning the infrastructure. This is particularly true in Europe, where this arrangement is required by the European Union. This has allowed open access by any train operator to any portion of the European railway network. In the UK, the railway track is state owned, with a public controlled body (Network Rail) running, maintaining and developing the track, while Train Operating Companies have run the trains since privatization in the 1990s.

In the U.S., virtually all rail networks and infrastructure outside the Northeast Corridor are privately owned by freight lines. Passenger lines, primarily Amtrak, operate as tenants on the freight lines. Consequently, operations must be closely synchronized and coordinated between freight and passenger railroads, with passenger trains often being dispatched by the host freight railroad. Due to this shared system, both are regulated by the Federal Railroad Administration (FRA) and may follow the AREMA recommended practices for track work and AAR standards for vehicles.

Financing
The main source of income for railway companies is from ticket revenue (for passenger transport) and shipment fees for cargo. Discounts and monthly passes are sometimes available for frequent travellers (e.g. season ticket and rail pass). Freight revenue may be sold per container slot or for a whole train. Sometimes, the shipper owns the cars and only rents the haulage. For passenger transport, advertisement income can be significant.

Governments may choose to give subsidies to rail operation, since rail transport has fewer externalities than other dominant modes of transport. If the railway company is state-owned, the state may simply provide direct subsidies in exchange for increased production. If operations have been privatised, several options are available. Some countries have a system where the infrastructure is owned by a government agency or company – with open access to the tracks for any company that meets safety requirements. In such cases, the state may choose to provide the tracks free of charge, or for a fee that does not cover all costs. This is seen as analogous to the government providing free access to roads. For passenger operations, a direct subsidy may be paid to a public-owned operator, or public service obligation tender may be held, and a time-limited contract awarded to the lowest bidder. Total EU rail subsidies amounted to €73 billion in 2005.

Via Rail Canada and US passenger rail service Amtrak are private railroad companies chartered by their respective national governments. As private passenger services declined because of competition from cars and airlines, they became shareholders of Amtrak either with a cash entrance fee or relinquishing their locomotives and rolling stock. The government subsidises Amtrak by supplying start-up capital and making up for losses at the end of the fiscal year.

Safety

Trains can travel at very high speeds, but they are heavy, unable to deviate from the track, and require great distances to stop. Possible accidents include: derailment (jumping the track); a collision with another train; or collision with automobiles, other vehicles, or pedestrians at level crossings, which accounts for the majority of all rail accidents and casualties. To minimize the risk of accidents, the most important safety measures are strict operating rules, e.g. railway signalling, and gates or grade separation at crossings. Train whistles, bells, or horns warn of the presence of a train, while trackside signals maintain the distances between trains. Another method used to increase safety is the addition of platform screen doors to separate the platform from train tracks. These prevent unauthorised incursion on to the train tracks which can result in accidents that cause serious harm or death, as well as providing other benefits such as preventing litter build up on the tracks which can pose a fire risk.

On many high-speed inter-city networks, such as Japan's Shinkansen, the trains run on dedicated railway lines without any level crossings. This is an important element in the safety of the system as it effectively eliminates the potential for collision with automobiles, other vehicles, or pedestrians, and greatly reduces the probability of collision with other trains. Another benefit is that services on the inter-city network remain punctual.

Maintenance
As in any infrastructure asset, railways must keep up with periodic inspection and maintenance in order to minimise the effect of infrastructure failures that can disrupt freight revenue operations and passenger services. Because passengers are considered the most crucial cargo and usually operate at higher speeds, steeper grades, and higher capacity/frequency, their lines are especially important. Inspection practices include track geometry cars or walking inspection. Curve maintenance especially for transit services includes gauging, fastener tightening, and rail replacement.

Rail corrugation is a common issue with transit systems due to the high number of light-axle, wheel passages which result in grinding of the wheel/rail interface. Since maintenance may overlap with operations, maintenance windows (nighttime hours, off-peak hours, altering train schedules or routes) must be closely followed. In addition, passenger safety during maintenance work (inter-track fencing, proper storage of materials, track work notices, hazards of equipment near states) must be regarded at all times. At times, maintenance access problems can emerge due to tunnels, elevated structures, and congested cityscapes. Here, specialised equipment or smaller versions of conventional maintenance gear are used.

Unlike highways or road networks where capacity is disaggregated into unlinked trips over individual route segments, railway capacity is fundamentally considered a network system. As a result, many components are causes and effects of system disruptions. Maintenance must acknowledge the vast array of a route's performance (type of train service, origination/destination, seasonal impacts), a line's capacity (length, terrain, number of tracks, types of train control), trains throughput (max speeds, acceleration/ deceleration rates), and service features with shared passenger-freight tracks (sidings, terminal capacities, switching routes, and design type).

Social, economical, and energetic aspects

Energy

Transport by rail is an energy-efficient but capital-intensive means of mechanized land transport. The tracks provide smooth and hard surfaces on which the wheels of the train can roll with a relatively low level of friction being generated. Moving a vehicle on and/or through a medium (land, sea, or air) requires that it overcomes resistance to its motion caused by friction. A land vehicle's total resistance (in pounds or Newtons) is a quadratic function of the vehicle's speed:

where:
  denotes total resistance;
  denotes initial constant resistance;
  denotes velocity-related constant;
  denotes constant that is function of shape, frontal area, and sides of vehicle; and
  denotes velocity.

Essentially, resistance differs between a vehicle's contact point and the surface of the roadway. In terms of cargo capacity combining speed and size being moved in a day:
 horse and wheelbarrow can carry 4 tmi/day (5.8 tkm/day)
 horse cart on good pavement can carry 10 tmi/day (14 tkm/day)
 fully utility truck can carry 20,000 tmi/day (29,000 tkm/day)
 long-haul train can carry 500,000 tmi/day (730,000 tkm/day) Most trains take 250–400 trucks off the road, thus making the road safer.

In terms of the horsepower to weight ratio, a slow-moving barge requires , a railway and pipeline requires , and truck requires . However, at higher speeds, a railway overcomes the barge and proves most economical.

The track distributes the weight of the train evenly, allowing significantly greater loads per axle and wheel than in road transport, leading to less wear and tear on the permanent way. This can save energy compared with other forms of transport, such as road transport, which depends on the friction between rubber tyres and the road. Trains have a small frontal area in relation to the load they are carrying, which reduces air resistance and thus energy usage.

In addition, the presence of track guiding the wheels allows for very long trains to be pulled by one or a few engines and driven by a single operator, even around curves, which allows for economies of scale in both manpower and energy use; by contrast, in road transport, more than two articulations causes fishtailing and makes the vehicle unsafe.

Energy efficiency

Considering only the energy spent to move the means of transport, and using the example of the urban area of Lisbon, electric trains seem to be on average 20 times more efficient than automobiles for transportation of passengers, if we consider energy spent per passenger-distance with similar occupation ratios.

Usage
Due to these benefits, rail transport is a major form of passenger and freight transport in many countries. It is ubiquitous in Europe, with an integrated network covering virtually the whole continent. In India, China, South Korea and Japan, many millions use trains as regular transport. In North America, freight rail transport is widespread and heavily used, but intercity passenger rail transport is relatively scarce outside the Northeast Corridor, due to increased preference of other modes, particularly automobiles and airplanes. However, implementing new and improved ways such as making it easily accessible within neighborhoods can aid in reducing commuters from using private vehicles and airplanes.

South Africa, northern Africa and Argentina have extensive rail networks, but some railways elsewhere in Africa and South America are isolated lines. Australia has a generally sparse network befitting its population density but has some areas with significant networks, especially in the southeast. In addition to the previously existing east–west transcontinental line in Australia, a line from north to south has been constructed. The highest railway in the world is the line to Lhasa, in Tibet, partly running over permafrost territory. Western Europe has the highest railway density in the world and many individual trains there operate through several countries despite technical and organizational differences in each national network.

Social and economic impact

Modernization
Railways are central to the formation of modernity and ideas of progress. The process of modernization in the 19th century involved a transition from a spatially oriented world to a time-oriented world. Exact time was essential, and everyone had to know what the time was, resulting in clocks towers for railway stations, clocks in public places, pocket watches for railway workers and for travelers.  Trains left on time (they never left early). By contrast, in the premodern era, passenger ships left when the captain had enough passengers. In the premodern era, local time was set at noon, when the sun was at its highest. Every place east to west had a different time and that changed with the introduction of standard time zones. Printed time tables were a convenience for the travelers, but more elaborate time tables, called train orders, were even more essential for the train crews, the maintenance workers, the station personnel, and for the repair and maintenance crews, who knew when to expect a train would come along. Most trackage was single track, with sidings and signals to allow lower priority trains to be sidetracked. Schedules told everyone what to do, where to be, and exactly when. If bad weather disrupted the system, telegraphers relayed immediate corrections and updates throughout the system.  Just as railways as business organizations created the standards and models for modern big business, so too the railway timetable was adapted to myriad uses, such as schedules for buses, ferries, and airplanes, for radio and television programs, for school schedules, for factory time clocks. The modern world was ruled by the clock and the timetable.

Nation-building
Scholars have linked railroads to successful nation-building efforts by states.

Model of corporate management
According to historian Henry Adams the system of railroads needed:
the energies of a generation, for it required all the new machinery to be created capital, banks, mines, furnaces, shops, power-houses, technical knowledge, mechanical population, together with a steady remodelling of social and political habits, ideas, and institutions to fit the new scale and suit the new conditions. The generation between 1865 and 1895 was already mortgaged to the railways, and no one knew it better than the generation itself.
The impact can be examined through five aspects: shipping, finance, management, careers, and popular reaction.

Shipping freight and passengers

First they provided a highly efficient network for shipping freight and passengers across a large national market. The result was a transforming impact on most sectors of the economy including manufacturing, retail and wholesale, agriculture, and finance. The United States now had an integrated national market practically the size of Europe, with no internal barriers or tariffs, all supported by a common language, and financial system and a common legal system.

Basis of the private financial system
Railroads financing provided the basis for a dramatic expansion of the private (non-governmental) financial system. Construction of railroads was far more expensive than factories. In 1860, the combined total of railroad stocks and bonds was $1.8 billion; 1897 it reached $10.6 billion (compared to a total national debt of $1.2 billion).
Funding came from financiers throughout the Northeast, and from Europe, especially Britain. About 10 percent of the funding came from the government, especially in the form of land grants that could be realized when a certain amount of trackage was opened. The emerging American financial system was based on railroad bonds. New York by 1860 was the dominant financial market. The British invested heavily in railroads around the world, but nowhere more so than the United States; The total came to about $3 billion by 1914. In 1914–1917, they liquidated their American assets to pay for war supplies.

Inventing modern management
Railroad management designed complex systems that could handle far more complicated simultaneous relationships than could be dreamed of by the local factory owner who could patrol every part of his own factory in a matter of hours. Civil engineers became the senior management of railroads. The leading American innovators were the Western Railroad of Massachusetts and the Baltimore and Ohio Railroad in the 1840s, the Erie in the 1850s and the Pennsylvania in the 1860s.

Career paths
The railroads invented the career path in the private sector for both blue-collar workers and white-collar workers. Railroading became a lifetime career for young men; women were almost never hired. A typical career path would see a young man hired at age 18 as a shop laborer, be promoted to skilled mechanic at age 24, brakemen at 25, freight conductor at 27, and passenger conductor at age 57. White-collar careers paths likewise were delineated. Educated young men started in clerical or statistical work and moved up to station agents or bureaucrats at the divisional or central headquarters.  At each level they had more and more knowledge, experience, and human capital. They were very hard to replace, and were virtually guaranteed permanent jobs and provided with insurance and medical care. Hiring, firing, and wage rates were set not by foremen, but by central administrators, in order to minimize favoritism and personality conflicts. Everything was done by the book, whereby an increasingly complex set of rules dictated to everyone exactly what should be done in every circumstance, and exactly what their rank and pay would be. By the 1880s the career railroaders were retiring, and pension systems were invented for them.

Transportation
Railways contribute to social vibrancy and economic competitiveness by transporting multitudes of customers and workers to city centres and inner suburbs. Hong Kong has recognized rail as "the backbone of the public transit system" and as such developed their franchised bus system and road infrastructure in comprehensive alignment with their rail services. China's large cities such as Beijing, Shanghai, and Guangzhou recognize rail transit lines as the framework and bus lines as the main body to their metropolitan transportation systems. The Japanese Shinkansen was built to meet the growing traffic demand in the "heart of Japan's industry and economy" situated on the Tokyo-Kobe line.

Wartime roles and air targets
 
In the 1863-70 decade the heavy use of railways in the American Civil War, and in Germany's wars against Austria and France, provided a speed of movement unheard-of in the days of horses. During much of the 20th century, rail was a key element of war plans for rapid military mobilization, allowing for the quick and efficient transport of large numbers of reservists to their mustering-points, and infantry soldiers to the front lines. The Western Front in France during World War I required many trainloads of munitions a day. Rail yards and bridges in Germany and occupied France were major targets of Allied air power in World War II.

Positive impacts
Railways channel growth towards dense city agglomerations and along their arteries, as opposed to highway expansion, indicative of the U.S. transportation policy, which encourages development of suburbs at the periphery, contributing to increased vehicle miles travelled, carbon emissions, development of greenfield spaces, and depletion of natural reserves. These arrangements revalue city spaces, local taxes, housing values, and promotion of mixed use development.

Negative impacts
Bryant Chad found that in 1840s Austria the arrival of railways and steam locomotives angered locals because of the noise, smell, and pollution caused by the trains and the damage to homes and the surrounding land caused by the engine's soot and fiery embers; and since most travel was very local ordinary people seldom used the new line.

Pollution
A 2018 study found that the opening of the Beijing Metro caused a reduction in "most of the air pollutants concentrations (PM2.5, PM10, SO2, NO2, and CO) but had little effect on ozone pollution."

Modern rail as economic development indicator
European development economists have argued that the existence of modern rail infrastructure is a significant indicator of a country's economic advancement: this perspective is illustrated notably through the Basic Rail Transportation Infrastructure Index (known as BRTI Index).

Subsidies

Asia

China
In 2014, total rail spending by China was $130 billion and is likely to remain at a similar rate for the rest of the country's next Five Year Period (2016–2020).

India

Europe

According to the 2017 European Railway Performance Index for intensity of use, quality of service and safety performance, the top tier European national rail systems consists of Switzerland, Denmark, Finland, Germany, Austria, Sweden, and France. Performance levels reveal a positive correlation between public cost and a given railway system's performance, and also reveal differences in the value that countries receive in return for their public cost. Denmark, Finland, France, Germany, the Netherlands, Sweden, and Switzerland capture relatively high value for their money, while Luxembourg, Belgium, Latvia, Slovakia, Portugal, Romania, and Bulgaria underperform relative to the average ratio of performance to cost among European countries.

Russia
In 2016 Russian Railways received 94.9 billion roubles (around US$1.4 billion) from the government.

North America

United States

In 2015, funding from the U.S. federal government for Amtrak was around US$1.4 billion. By 2018, appropriated funding had increased to approximately US$1.9 billion.

See also

 Derailment
 Environmental design in rail transportation
 History of transport
 International Union of Railways
 List of countries by rail transport network size
 List of countries by rail usage
 List of railroad-related periodicals
 List of railway companies
 List of railway industry occupations
 Passenger rail terminology
 Rail transport by country
 Mega project
 Mine railway
 Outline of rail transport
 Railway systems engineering
 Track gauge

Notes

References

Sources

Further reading
 Burton, Anthony. Railway Empire: How the British Gave Railways to the World (2018) excerpt
 Chant, Christopher. The world's railways: the history and development of rail transport (Chartwell Books, 2001).
 Faith, Nicholas. The World the Railways Made (2014) excerpt
 Freeman, Michael. "The Railway as Cultural Metaphor: ‘What Kind of Railway History?’ Revisited." Journal of Transport History 20.2 (1999): 160–167.
 Mukhopadhyay, Aparajita. Imperial Technology and ‘Native’Agency: A Social History of Railways in Colonial India, 1850–1920 (Taylor & Francis, 2018).
 Nock, O. S. Railways then and now: a world history  (1975) online
 Nock, O. S. World atlas of railways   (1978) online
 Nock, O. S. 150 years of main line railways  (1980) online
 Pirie, Gordon. "Tracking railway histories." Journal of Transport History 35.2 (2014): 242–248.
 Sawai, Minoru, ed. The Development of Railway Technology in East Asia in Comparative Perspective (#Sringer, 2017)
 Trains Magazine. The Historical Guide to North American Railroads (3rd ed. 2014)
 Wolmar, Christian. Blood, iron, and gold: How the railroads transformed the world (Public Affairs, 2011).

External links

 
Transportation engineering
Infrastructure